Virroconus is a subgenus of sea snails, marine gastropod mollusks in the genus Conus, family Conidae, the cone snails and their allies.

In the latest classification of the family Conidae by Puillandre N., Duda T.F., Meyer C., Olivera B.M. & Bouchet P. (2015), Virroconus has become a subgenus of Conus as Conus (Virroconus) Iredale, 1930  (type species: Conus ebraeus Linnaeus, 1758): synonym of  Conus Linnaeus, 1758

Species
 Virroconus chaldaeus (Röding, 1798): synonym of  Conus chaldaeus (Röding, 1798)
 Virroconus ebraeus (Linnaeus, 1758): synonym of  Conus ebraeus Linnaeus, 1758
 Virroconus judaeus (Bergh, 1895): synonym of  Conus judaeus Bergh, 1895

References

External links
 To World Register of Marine Species

Conidae